In international rallying, R5 refers to a class of cars competing under Group R regulations. R5 regulations were introduced by the Fédération Internationale de l'Automobile (FIA) in 2012 as a replacement for the Super 2000 class. In 2019 the FIA renamed the R5 specification ruleset to Group Rally2 as part of a wider plan to reorganise FIA championships and replace Group R with new Groups Rally. Existing FIA homologated R5 cars remain eligible for any FIA Rally2 level competition, and non-homologated R5 or Rally2 cars should be accepted equally at national level where approved. R5/Rally2 cars are based on production cars and feature a 1600cc turbocharged petrol engine.

R5 cars are a step down from World Rally Cars in their power and performance. They are eligible to compete in the World Rally Championship and in a dedicated series known as the World Rally Championship-2. This championship is exclusively open to manufacturer and professional independent teams competing in R5 cars. In 2020 and 2021, privateer entries in R5 cars contested the World Rally Championship-3. R5 cars also compete in regional championships such as the European Rally Championship and national-level events such as the British Rally Championship.

List of R5 models

The following models are eligible to compete in the World Rally Championship and its support categories:

Notes

References

Rally groups
Rally racing
Fédération Internationale de l'Automobile